, son of regent Sukehiro, was a Kugyō or Japanese court noble of the late Tokugawa shogunate and early Meiji periods. Among his consorts was a daughter of Hachisuka Narihiro, the thirteenth head of Tokushima Domain. In September 1867 he died at age 19.

References
 
 Japanese Wikipedia

1849 births
1867 deaths
Fujiwara clan
Takatsukasa family